Sag Harbor was the terminus of the abandoned Sag Harbor Branch of the Long Island Rail Road, and was one of two stations within the village of Sag Harbor, New York. It opened in 1870 with the arrival of the LIRR into Sag Harbor, and was the eastern terminus of the LIRR on the south fork of Long Island until 1895, when the Brooklyn and Montauk Railroad built a line from Bridgehampton to Montauk, thus converting the line into a spur north of Bridgehampton. Besides the standard passenger station, it also contained a freight house, and "express building," two yards, a spur to "Long Wharf" which was owned by the LIRR affiliated Montauk Steamboat Company, a coal trestle, a turntable, and a three-story grain storage building owned by The station was rebuilt in 1909 in a manner similar to such stations as Riverhead, Bay Shore, Manhasset, and Bayside stations, among others. During World War I, it was used to transport torpedoes to Long Wharf in order to test them. It was abandoned in 1939 along with the branch. Today, Long Wharf is Suffolk County Road 81, and the former freight house is now the headquarters of the Sag Harbor Garden Center.

References

External links
Bob Emery hand-drawn map of Sag Harbor Station

Sag Harbor, New York
Railway stations in the United States opened in 1870
1870 establishments in New York (state)
Railway stations closed in 1939
Former Long Island Rail Road stations in Suffolk County, New York